The 1963 WCHA Men's Ice Hockey Tournament was the 4th conference playoff in league history. The tournament was played between March 7 and March 9, 1963. All games were played at home team campus sites. By reaching the title game both Denver and North Dakota were invited to participate in the 1963 NCAA Men's Ice Hockey Tournament.

Format
The top four teams in the WCHA, based upon the conference regular season standings, were eligible for the tournament and were seeded No. 1 through No. 4. In the first round the first and fourth seeds and the second and third seeds were matched in two-game series where the school that scored the higher number of goals was declared the winner. The winners advanced to the title game which was to be played at the higher remaining seed's home venue.

Conference standings
Note: GP = Games played; W = Wins; L = Losses; T = Ties; PCT = Winning percentage; GF = Goals for; GA = Goals against

Bracket

First round

(1) Denver vs. (4) Minnesota

(2) North Dakota vs. (3) Michigan Tech

Final

(1) Denver vs. (2) North Dakota

Tournament awards
None

See also
Western Collegiate Hockey Association men's champions

References

External links
WCHA.com
1962–63 WCHA Standings
1962–63 NCAA Standings
2013–14 Denver Pioneers Media Guide
2013–14 Minnesota Golden Gophers Media Guide 
2013–14 North Dakota Hockey Media Guide

WCHA Men's Ice Hockey Tournament
Wcha Men's Ice Hockey Tournament